Francis Downes (11 June 1864 – 20 May 1916) was an Australian cricketer. He played six first-class matches for New South Wales between 1881/82 and 1890/91.

See also
 List of New South Wales representative cricketers

References

External links
 

1864 births
1916 deaths
Australian cricketers
New South Wales cricketers
Cricketers from Sydney